Paracles reversa is a moth of the subfamily Arctiinae first described by E. Dukinfield Jones in 1908. It is found in Brazil.

References

Moths described in 1908
Paracles